Matthew Foster Fell (23 August 1875 – 17 March 1957) was an Australian rules footballer who played for the Collingwood Football Club during the early years of the Victorian Football League (VFL).

Fell came to Collingwood from the town of Tungamah and made his senior debut in Round One 1898, soon establishing himself in the side as a utility player. He was a ruckman in the 1901 VFL Grand Final loss to Essendon Football Club and a defender in the 1902 and 1903 premierships. From 1903 until the third round of the 1904 VFL season he played in 17 successive wins. Fell's last game of VFL football was the 1905 VFL Grand Final, which Collingwood lost.

References

 
Holmesby, Russell and Main, Jim (2007). The Encyclopedia of AFL Footballers. 7th ed. Melbourne: Bas Publishing.

1875 births
Australian rules footballers from Victoria (Australia)
Collingwood Football Club players
Collingwood Football Club Premiership players
1957 deaths
Two-time VFL/AFL Premiership players